During World War II, the United States Army Air Forces (USAAF) established numerous airfields in Kentucky for training pilots and aircrews of USAAF fighters and bombers.

Most of these airfields were under the command of First Air Force or the Army Air Forces Training Command (AAFTC) (A predecessor of the current-day United States Air Force Air Education and Training Command).  However the other USAAF support commands (Air Technical Service Command (ATSC); Air Transport Command (ATC) or Troop Carrier Command) commanded a significant number of airfields in a support roles.

It is still possible to find remnants of these wartime airfields. Many were converted into municipal airports, some were returned to agriculture and several were retained as United States Air Force installations and were front-line bases during the Cold War. Hundreds of the temporary buildings that were used survive today, and are being used for other purposes.

Major airfields

First Air Force
 Godman AAF, Fort Knox
 Support for Fort Knox
 99th Army Air Force Base Unit
 Was: Godman Air Force Base (1947-1954)
 Now: active United States Army Airfield 
 Campbell AAF, Fort Campbell/Hopkinsville
 Sub-base of Smyrna AAF, Tennessee
 99th Army Air Force Base Unit (DET)
 Was: Campbell Air Force Base (1947-1959)
 Now: active United States Army Airfield 

Air Technical Service Command
 Louisville MAP, Louisville
 Aircraft Modification Center
 Now: Louisville International Airport and Louisville Air National Guard Base 

Troop Carrier Command
 Bowman Field AAF, Louisville
 AAF Convalescent Hospital
 27th Army Air Force Base Unit
 Now: Bowman Field Airport 
 Lexington/Bluegrass AAF, Lexington
 Auxiliary to Bowman AAF
 Now: Blue Grass Airport

References
 Maurer, Maurer (1983). Air Force Combat Units Of World War II. Maxwell AFB, Alabama: Office of Air Force History. .
 Ravenstein, Charles A. (1984). Air Force Combat Wings Lineage and Honors Histories 1947-1977. Maxwell AFB, Alabama: Office of Air Force History. .
 Thole, Lou (1999), Forgotten Fields of America : World War II Bases and Training, Then and Now - Vol. 2.  Pictorial Histories Pub . 
 Military Airfields in World War II - Kentucky

External links

 01
World War II
World War II
Airfields of the United States Army Air Forces in the United States by state
United States World War II army airfields